Opteron is AMD's x86 former server and workstation processor line, and was the first processor which supported the AMD64 instruction set architecture (known generically as x86-64). It was released on April 22, 2003, with the SledgeHammer core (K8) and was intended to compete in the server and workstation markets, particularly in the same segment as the Intel Xeon processor. Processors based on the AMD K10 microarchitecture (codenamed Barcelona) were announced on September 10, 2007, featuring a new quad-core configuration. The most-recently released Opteron CPUs are the Piledriver-based Opteron 4300 and 6300 series processors, codenamed "Seoul" and "Abu Dhabi" respectively.

In January 2016, the first ARMv8-A based Opteron-branded SoC was released, though it is unclear what, if any, heritage this Opteron-branded product line shares with the original Opteron technology other than intended use in the server space.

Technical description

Two key capabilities
Opteron combines two important capabilities in a single processor:
 native execution of legacy x86 32-bit applications without speed penalties
 native execution of x86-64 64-bit applications

The first capability is notable because at the time of Opteron's introduction, the only other 64-bit architecture marketed with 32-bit x86 compatibility (Intel's Itanium) ran x86 legacy-applications only with significant speed degradation. The second capability, by itself, is less noteworthy, as major RISC architectures (such as SPARC, Alpha, PA-RISC, PowerPC, MIPS) have been 64-bit for many years.  In combining these two capabilities, however, the Opteron earned recognition for its ability to run the vast installed base of x86 applications economically, while simultaneously offering an upgrade path to 64-bit computing.

The Opteron processor possesses an integrated memory controller supporting DDR SDRAM, DDR2 SDRAM or DDR3 SDRAM (depending on processor generation).  This both reduces the latency penalty for accessing the main RAM and eliminates the need for a separate northbridge chip.

Multi-processor features
In multi-processor systems (more than one Opteron on a single motherboard), the CPUs communicate using the Direct Connect Architecture over high-speed HyperTransport links. Each CPU can access the main memory of another processor, transparent to the programmer. The Opteron approach to multi-processing is not the same as standard symmetric multiprocessing; instead of having one bank of memory for all CPUs, each CPU has its own memory. Thus the Opteron is a Non-Uniform Memory Access (NUMA) architecture. The Opteron CPU directly supports up to an 8-way configuration, which can be found in mid-level servers. Enterprise-level servers use additional (and expensive) routing chips to support more than 8 CPUs per box.

In a variety of computing benchmarks, the Opteron architecture has demonstrated better multi-processor scaling than the Intel Xeon which didn't have a point to point system until QPI and integrated memory controllers with the Nehalem design. This is primarily because adding another Opteron processor increases memory bandwidth, while that is not always the case for Xeon systems, and the fact that the Opterons use a switched fabric, rather than a shared bus. In particular, the Opteron's integrated memory controller allows the CPU to access local RAM very quickly.  In contrast, multiprocessor Xeon system CPUs share only two common buses for both processor-processor and processor-memory communication. As the number of CPUs increases in a typical Xeon system, contention for the shared bus causes computing efficiency to drop. Intel migrated to a memory architecture similar to the Opteron's for the Intel Core i7 family of processors and their Xeon derivatives.

Multi-core Opterons

In April 2005, AMD introduced its first multi-core Opterons. At the time, AMD's use of the term multi-core in practice meant dual-core; each physical Opteron chip contained two processor cores. This effectively doubled the computing performance available to each motherboard processor socket. One socket could then deliver the performance of two processors, two sockets could deliver the performance of four processors, and so on. Because motherboard costs increase dramatically as the number of CPU sockets increase, multicore CPUs enable a multiprocessing system to be built at lower cost.

AMD's model number scheme has changed somewhat in light of its new multicore lineup. At the time of its introduction, AMD's fastest multicore Opteron was the model 875, with two cores running at 2.2 GHz each. AMD's fastest single-core Opteron at this time was the model 252, with one core running at 2.6 GHz. For multithreaded applications, or many single threaded applications, the model 875 would be much faster than the model 252.

Second-generation Opterons are offered in three series: the 1000 Series (single socket only), the 2000 Series (dual socket-capable), and the 8000 Series (quad or octo socket-capable). The 1000 Series uses the AM2 socket. The 2000 Series and 8000 Series use Socket F.

AMD announced its third-generation quad-core Opteron chips on September 10, 2007 
with hardware vendors announcing servers in the following month. Based on a core design codenamed Barcelona, new power and thermal management techniques were planned for the chips. Earlier dual core DDR2 based platforms were upgradeable to quad core chips.
The fourth generation was announced in June 2009 with the Istanbul hexa-cores. It introduced HT Assist, an additional directory for data location, reducing the overhead for probing and broadcasts. HT Assist uses 1 MB L3 cache per CPU when activated.

In March 2010 AMD released the Magny-Cours Opteron 6100 series CPUs for Socket G34. These are 8- and 12-core multi-chip module CPUs consisting of two four or six-core dies with a HyperTransport 3.1 link connecting the two dies. These CPUs updated the multi-socket Opteron platform to use DDR3 memory and increased the maximum HyperTransport link speed from 2.40 GHz (4.80 GT/s) for the Istanbul CPUs to 3.20 GHz (6.40 GT/s).

AMD changed the naming scheme for its Opteron models. Opteron 4000 series CPUs on Socket C32 (released July 2010) are dual-socket capable and are targeted at uniprocessor and dual-processor uses. The Opteron 6000 series CPUs on Socket G34 are quad-socket capable and are targeted at high-end dual-processor and quad-processor applications.

Socket 939
AMD released Socket 939 Opterons, reducing the cost of motherboards for low-end servers and workstations. Except for the fact they have 1 MB L2 cache (versus 512 KB for the Athlon 64) the Socket 939 Opterons are identical to the San Diego and Toledo core Athlon 64s, but are run at lower clock speeds than the cores are capable of, making them more stable.

Socket AM2
Socket AM2 Opterons are available for servers that only have a single-chip setup. Codenamed Santa Ana, rev. F dual core AM2 Opterons feature 2 × 1 MB L2 cache, unlike the majority of their Athlon 64 X2 cousins which feature 2 × 512 KB L2 cache. These CPUs are given model numbers ranging from 1210 to 1224.

Socket AM2+
AMD introduced three quad-core Opterons on Socket AM2+ for single-CPU servers in 2007. These CPUs are produced on a 65 nm manufacturing process and are similar to the Agena Phenom X4 CPUs. The Socket AM2+ quad-core Opterons are code-named "Budapest". The Socket AM2+ Opterons carry model numbers of 1352 (2.10 GHz), 1354 (2.20 GHz), and 1356 (2.30 GHz).

Socket AM3
AMD introduced three quad-core Opterons on Socket AM3 for single-CPU servers in 2009. These CPUs are produced on a 45 nm manufacturing process and are similar to the Deneb-based Phenom II X4 CPUs. The Socket AM3 quad-core Opterons are code-named "Suzuka". These CPUs carry model numbers of 1381 (2.50 GHz), 1385 (2.70 GHz), and 1389 (2.90 GHz).

Socket AM3+
Socket AM3+ was introduced in 2011 and is a modification of AM3 for the Bulldozer microarchitecture. Opteron CPUs in the AM3+ package are named Opteron 3xxx.

Socket F
Socket F (LGA 1207 contacts) is AMD’s second generation of Opteron socket. This socket supports processors such as the Santa Rosa, Barcelona, Shanghai, and Istanbul codenamed processors. the "lidded land grid array" socket adds support for DDR2 SDRAM and improved HyperTransport version 3 connectivity. Physically the socket and processor package are nearly identical, although not generally compatible with socket 1207 FX.

Socket G34
Socket G34 (LGA 1944 contacts) is one of the third generation of Opteron sockets, along with Socket C32. This socket supports Magny-Cours Opteron 6100, Bulldozer-based Interlagos Opteron 6200, and Piledriver-based "Abu Dhabi" Opteron 6300 series processors. This socket supports four channels of DDR3 SDRAM (two per CPU die). Unlike previous multi-CPU Opteron sockets, Socket G34 CPUs will function with unbuffered ECC or non-ECC RAM in addition to the traditional registered ECC RAM.

Socket C32
Socket C32 (LGA 1207 contacts) is the other member of the third generation of Opteron sockets. This socket is physically similar to Socket F but is not compatible with Socket F CPUs. Socket C32 uses DDR3 SDRAM and is keyed differently so as to prevent the insertion of Socket F CPUs that can use only DDR2 SDRAM. Like Socket G34, Socket C32 CPUs will be able to use unbuffered ECC or non-ECC RAM in addition to registered ECC SDRAM.

Micro-architecture update
The Opteron line saw an update with the implementation of the AMD K10 microarchitecture. New processors, launched in the third quarter of 2007 (codename Barcelona), incorporate a variety of improvements, particularly in memory prefetching, speculative loads, SIMD execution and branch prediction, yielding an appreciable performance improvement over K8-based Opterons, within the same power envelope.

In 2007 AMD introduced a scheme to characterize the power consumption of new processors under "average" daily usage, named average CPU power (ACP).

Socket FT3
The Opteron X1150 and Opteron X2150 APU are used with the BGA-769 or Socket FT3.

Features

CPUs

APUs
APU features table

Models
For Socket 940 and Socket 939 Opterons, each chip has a three-digit model number, in the form Opteron XYY. For Socket F and Socket AM2 Opterons, each chip has a four-digit model number, in the form Opteron XZYY. For all first, second, and third-generation Opterons, the first digit (the X) specifies the number of CPUs on the target machine:
 1 – Designed for uniprocessor systems
 2 – Designed for dual-processor systems
 8 – Designed for systems with 4 or 8 processors
For Socket F and Socket AM2 Opterons, the second digit (the Z) represents the processor generation. Presently, only 2 (dual-core, DDR2), 3 (quad-core, DDR2) and 4 (six-core, DDR2) are used.

Socket C32 and G34 Opterons use a new four-digit numbering scheme. The first digit refers to the number of CPUs in the target machine:

4 – Designed for uniprocessor and dual-processor systems.
6 – Designed for dual-processor and four-processor systems.

Like the previous second and third generation Opterons, the second number refers to the processor generation. "1" refers to AMD K10-based units (Magny-Cours and Lisbon), "2" refers to the Bulldozer-based Interlagos, Valencia, and Zurich-based units, and "3" refers to the Piledriver-based Abu Dhabi, Seoul, and Delhi-based units.

For all Opterons, the last two digits in the model number (the YY) indicate the clock frequency of a CPU, a higher number indicating a higher clock frequency. This speed indication is comparable to processors of the same generation if they have the same amount of cores, single-cores and dual-cores have different indications despite sometimes having the same clock frequency.

The suffix HE or EE indicates a high-efficiency/energy-efficiency model having a lower TDP than a standard Opteron. The suffix SE indicates a top-of-the-line model having a higher TDP than a standard Opteron.

Starting from 65 nm fabrication process, the Opteron codenames have been based on Formula 1 hosting cities; AMD has a long term sponsorship with F1's most successful team, Ferrari.

Opteron (130 nm SOI)

Single-core – SledgeHammer (1yy, 2yy, 8yy)
 CPU steppings: B3, C0, CG
 L1 cache: 64 + 64 KB (data + instructions)
 L2 cache: 1024 KB, full speed
 MMX, Extended 3DNow!, SSE, SSE2, AMD64
 Socket 940, 800 MHz HyperTransport
 Registered DDR SDRAM required, ECC possible
 VCore: 1.50–1.55 V
 Max power (TDP): 89 W
 First release: April 22, 2003
 Clock rate: 1.4–2.4 GHz (x40 – x50)

Opteron (90 nm SOI, DDR)

Single-core – Venus (1yy), Troy (2yy), Athens (8yy)
 CPU steppings: E4
 L1 cache: 64 + 64 KB (data + instructions)
 L2 cache: 1024 KB, full speed
 MMX, Extended 3DNow!, SSE, SSE2, SSE3, AMD64
 Socket 940, 800 MHz HyperTransport
 Socket 939/Socket 940, 1000 MHz HyperTransport
 Registered DDR SDRAM required for socket 940, ECC possible
 VCore: 1.35–1.4 V
 Max power (TDP): 95 W
 NX bit
 64-bit segment limit checks for VMware-style binary-translation virtualization.
 Optimized Power Management (OPM)
 First release: December 2004
 Clock rate: 1.6–3.0 GHz (x42 – x56)

Dual-core – Denmark (1yy), Italy (2yy), Egypt (8yy)
 CPU steppings: E1, E6
 First release: April 2005
 Clock rate: 1.6–2.8 GHz (x60, x65, x70, x75, x80, x85, x90)
 Socket 939/Socket 940, 1000 MHz HyperTransport
 NX bit

Opteron (90 nm SOI, DDR2)

Dual-core – Santa Ana (12yy), Santa Rosa (22yy, 82yy)
 CPU steppings: F2, F3
 L1 cache: 64 + 64 KB (data + instructions)
 L2 cache: 2 × 1024 KB, full speed
 MMX, Extended 3DNow!, SSE, SSE2, SSE3, AMD64
 Socket F, 1000 MHz HyperTransport – Opteron 22yy, 82yy
 Socket AM2, 1000 MHz HyperTransport – Opteron 12yy
 VCore: 1.35 V
 Max power (TDP): 95 W
 NX bit
 AMD-V Virtualization
 Optimized Power Management (OPM)
 First release: ?????? 2006
 Clock rate: 1.8–3.2 GHz (xx10, xx12, xx14, xx16, xx18, xx20, xx22, xx24)

Opteron (65 nm SOI)

Quad-core – Barcelona (23xx, 83xx) 2360/8360 and below, Budapest (13yy) 1356 and below
 CPU steppings: BA, B3
 L1 cache: 64 + 64 KB (data + instructions) per core
 L2 cache: 512 KB, full speed per core
 L3 cache: 2048 KB, shared
 MMX, Extended 3DNow!, SSE, SSE2, SSE3, AMD64, SSE4a, ABM
 Socket F, Socket AM2+, HyperTransport 3.0 (1.6–2 GHz)
 Registered DDR2 SDRAM required, ECC possible
 VCore: 1.2 V
 Max power (TDP): 95 W
 NX bit
 2nd-generation AMD-V Virtualization with Rapid Virtualization Indexing (RVI)
 Split power plane dynamic power management
 First release: September 10, 2007
 Clock rate: 1.7–2.5 GHz

Opteron (45 nm SOI)

Quad-core – Shanghai (23xx, 83xx) 2370/8370 and above, Suzuka (13yy) 1381 and above

 CPU steppings: C2
 L3 cache: 6 MB, shared
 Clock rate: 2.3–2.9 GHz
 HyperTransport 1.0, 3.0
 20% reduction in idle power consumption
 support for DDR2 800 MHz memory (Socket F)
 support for DDR3 1333 MHz memory (Socket AM3)

6-core – Istanbul (24xx, 84xx)

Released June 1, 2009.

 CPU steppings: D0
 L3 cache: 6 MB, shared
 Clock rate: 2.2–2.8 GHz
 HyperTransport 3.0
 HT Assist
 Support for DDR2 800 MHz memory

8-core – Magny-Cours MCM (6124–6140)

Released March 29, 2010.

 CPU steppings: D1
 Multi-chip module consisting of two quad-core dies
 L2 cache: 8 × 512 KB
 L3 cache: 2 × 6 MB, shared
 Clockrate: 2.0–2.6 GHz
 Four HyperTransport 3.1 at 3.2 GHz (6.40 GT/s)
 HT Assist
 Support for DDR3 1333 MHz memory
 Socket G34

12-core – Magny-Cours MCM (6164-6180SE)

Released March 29, 2010

 CPU steppings: D1
 Multi-chip module consisting of two hexa-core dies
 L2 cache, 12 × 512 KB
 L3 cache: 2 × 6 MB, shared
 Clock rate: 1.7–2.5 GHz
 Four HyperTransport 3.1 links at 3.2 GHz (6.40 GT/s)
 HT Assist
 Support for DDR3 1333 MHz memory
 Socket G34

Quad-core – Lisbon (4122, 4130)

Released June 23, 2010

 CPU steppings: D0
 L3 cache: 6 MB
 Clock rate: 2.2 GHz (4122), 2.6 GHz (4130)
 Two HyperTransport links at 3.2 GHz (6.40 GT/s)
 HT Assist
 Support for DDR3-1333 memory
 Socket C32

Hex-core – Lisbon (4162–4184)

Released June 23, 2010

 CPU steppings: D1
 L3 cache: 6 MB
 Clock rate: 1.7–2.8 GHz
 Two HyperTransport links at 3.2 GHz (6.40 GT/s)
 HT Assist
 Support for DDR3-1333 memory
 Socket C32

Opteron (32 nm SOI) – First Generation Bulldozer Microarchitecture

Quad-core – Zurich (3250–3260)
Released March 20, 2012.

 CPU steppings: B2
 Single processor Bulldozer module
 L2 cache: 2 × 2 MB
 L3 cache: 4 MB
 Clock rate: 2.5 GHz (3250) – 2.7 GHz (3260)
 HyperTransport 3 (5.2 GT/s)
 HT Assist
 Support for DDR3 1866 MHz memory
 Turbo CORE support, up to 3.5 GHz (3250), up to 3.7 GHz (3260)
 Supports uniprocessor configurations only
 Socket AM3+

Eight-core – Zurich (3280)
Released March 20, 2012.

 CPU steppings: B2
 Single processor Bulldozer module
 L2 cache: 4 × 2 MB
 L3 cache: 8 MB
 Clock rate: 2.4 GHz
 HyperTransport 3 (5.2 GT/s)
 HT Assist
 Support for DDR3 1866 MHz memory
 Turbo CORE support, up to 3.5 GHz
 Supports uniprocessor configurations only
 Socket AM3+

6-core – Valencia (4226–4238)
Released November 14, 2011.

 CPU steppings: B2
 Single die consisting of three dual-core Bulldozer modules
 L2 cache: 6 MB
 L3 cache: 8 MB, shared
 Clock rate: 2.7–3.3 GHz (up to 3.1–3.7 GHz with Turbo CORE)
 Two HyperTransport 3.1 at 3.2 GHz (6.40 GT/s)
 HT Assist
 Support for DDR3 1866 MHz memory
 Turbo CORE support
 Supports up to dual-processor configurations
 Socket C32

8-core – Valencia (4256 HE-4284)
Released November 14, 2011.

 CPU steppings: B2
 Single die consisting of four dual-core Bulldozer modules
 L2 cache: 8 MB
 L3 cache: 8 MB, shared
 Clockrate: 1.6–3.0 GHz (up to 3.0-3.7 GHz with Turbo CORE)
 Two HyperTransport 3.1 at 3.2 GHz (6.40 GT/s)
 HT Assist
 Support for DDR3 1866 MHz memory
 Turbo CORE support
 Supports up to dual-processor configurations
 Socket C32

Quad-core – Interlagos MCM (6204)
Released November 14, 2011.

 CPU steppings: B2
 Multi-chip module consisting of two dies, each with one dual-core Bulldozer module
 L2 cache: 2 × 2 MB
 L3 cache: 2 × 8 MB, shared
 Clockrate: 3.3 GHz
 HyperTransport 3 at 3.2 GHz (6.40 GT/s)
 HT Assist
 Support for DDR3 1866 MHz memory
 Does not support Turbo CORE
 Supports up to quad-processor configurations
 Socket G34

8-core – Interlagos (6212, 6220)
Released November 14, 2011.

 CPU steppings: B2
 Multi-chip module consisting of two dies, each with two dual-core Bulldozer modules
 L2 cache: 2 × 4 MB
 L3 cache: 2 × 8 MB, shared
 Clockrate: 2.6, 3.0 GHz (up to 3.2 and 3.6 GHz with Turbo CORE)
 Four HyperTransport 3.1 at 3.2 GHz (6.40 GT/s)
 HT Assist
 Support for DDR3 1866 MHz memory
 Turbo CORE support
 Supports up to quad-processor configurations
 Socket G34

12-core – Interlagos (6234, 6238)
Released November 14, 2011.

 CPU steppings: B2
 Multi-chip module consisting of two dies, each with three dual-core Bulldozer modules
 L2 cache: 2 × 6 MB
 L3 cache: 2 × 8 MB, shared
 Clock rate: 2.4, 2.6 GHz (up to 3.1 and 3.3 GHz with Turbo CORE)
 Four HyperTransport 3.1 at 3.2 GHz (6.40 GT/s)
 HT Assist
 Support for DDR3 1866 MHz memory
 Turbo CORE support
 Supports up to quad-processor configurations
 Socket G34

16-core – Interlagos (6262 HE-6284 SE)
Released November 14, 2011.

 CPU steppings: B2
 Multi-chip module consisting of two dies, each with four dual-core Bulldozer modules
 L2 cache: 2 × 8 MB
 L3 cache: 2 × 8 MB, shared
 Clock rate: 1.6–2.7 GHz (up to 2.9-3.5 GHz with Turbo CORE)
 Four HyperTransport 3.1 at 3.2 GHz (6.40 GT/s)
 HT Assist
 Support for DDR3 1866 MHz memory
 Turbo CORE support
 Supports up to quad-processor configurations
 Socket G34

Opteron (32 nm SOI) – Piledriver microarchitecture

Quad-core – Delhi (3320 EE, 3350 HE)
Released December 4, 2012.

 CPU steppings: C0
 Single die consisting of two Piledriver modules
 L2 cache: 2 × 2 MB
 L3 cache: 8 MB, shared
 Clockrate: 1.9 GHz (3320 EE) – 2.8 GHz (3350 HE)
 1 × HyperTransport 3 (5.2 GT/s per link)
 HT Assist
 Support for DDR3 1866 MHz memory
 Turbo CORE support, up to 2.5 GHz (3320 EE), up to 3.8 GHz (3350 HE)
 Supports uniprocessor configurations only
 Socket AM3+

Eight-core – Delhi (3380)
Released December 4, 2012.

 CPU steppings: C0
 Single die consisting of four Piledriver modules
 L2 cache: 4 × 2 MB
 L3 cache: 8 MB, shared
 Clock rate: 2.6 GHz
 1 × HyperTransport 3 (5.2 GT/s per link)
 HT Assist
 Support for DDR3 1866 MHz memory
 Turbo CORE support, pp to 3.6 GHz
 Supports uniprocessor configurations only
 Socket AM3+

4-core – Seoul (4310 EE)
Released December 4, 2012

 CPU steppings: C0
 Single die consisting of two Piledriver modules
 L2 cache: 2 × 2 MB
 L3 cache: 8 MB, shared
 Clock rate: 2.2 GHz
 2 × HyperTransport 3.1 at 3.2 GHz (6.40 GT/s per link)
 HT Assist
 Support for DDR3 1866 MHz memory
 Turbo CORE support, up to 3.0 GHz
 Supports up to dual-processor configurations
 Socket C32

6-core – Seoul (4332 HE – 4340)
Released December 4, 2012

 CPU steppings: C0
 Single die consisting of three Piledriver modules
 L2 cache: 3 × 2 MB
 L3 cache: 8 MB, shared
 Clockrate: 3.0 GHz (4332 HE) – 3.5 GHz (4340)
 2 × HyperTransport 3.1 at 3.2 GHz (6.40 GT/s per link)
 HT Assist
 Support for DDR3 1866 MHz memory
 Turbo CORE support, from 3.5 GHz (4334) to 3.8 GHz (4340)
 Supports up to dual-processor configurations
 Socket C32

8-core – Seoul (4376 HE and above)
Released December 4, 2012

 CPU steppings: C0
 Single die consisting of four Piledriver modules
 L2 cache: 4 × 2 MB
 L3 cache: 8 MB, shared
 Clock rate: 2.6 GHz (4376 HE) – 3.1 GHz (4386)
 2 × HyperTransport 3.1 at 3.2 GHz (6.40 GT/s per link)
 HT Assist
 Support for DDR3 1866 MHz memory
 Turbo CORE support, from 3.6 GHz (4376 HE) to 3.8 GHz (4386)
 Supports up to dual-processor configurations
 Socket C32

Quad-core – Abu Dhabi MCM (6308)
Released November 5, 2012.

 CPU steppings: C0
 Multi-chip module consisting of two dies, each with one Piledriver module
 L2 cache: 2 MB per die (4 MB total)
 L3 cache: 2 × 8 MB, shared within each die
 Clock rate: 3.5 GHz
 4 × HyperTransport 3.1 at 3.2 GHz (6.40 GT/s per link)
 HT Assist
 Support for DDR3 1866 MHz memory
 Does not support Turbo CORE
 Supports up to quad-processor configurations
 Socket G34

Eight-core – Abu Dhabi MCM (6320, 6328)
Released November 5, 2012.

 CPU steppings: C0
 Multi-chip module consisting of two dies, each with two Piledriver module
 L2 cache: 2 × 2 MB per die (8 MB total)
 L2 cache: 2 × 8 MB, shared within each die
 Clock rate: 2.8 GHz (6320) – 3.2 GHz (6328)
 4 × HyperTransport 3.1 at 3.2 GHz (6.40 GT/s per link)
 HT Assist
 Support for DDR3 1866 MHz memory
 Turbo CORE support, from 3.3 GHz (6320) to 3.8 GHz (6328)
 Supports up to quad-processor configurations
 Socket G34

12-core – Abu Dhabi MCM (6344, 6348)
Released November 5, 2012.

 CPU steppings: C0
 Multi-chip module consisting of two dies, each with three Piledriver module
 L2 cache: 3 × 2 MB per die (12 MB total)
 L3 cache: 2 × 8 MB, shared within each die
 Clock rate: 2.6 GHz (6344) – 2.8 GHz (6348)
 4 × HyperTransport 3.1 at 3.2 GHz (6.40 GT/s per link)
 HT Assist
 Support for DDR3 1866 MHz memory
 Turbo CORE support, from 3.2 GHz (6344) to 3.4 GHz (6348)
 Supports up to quad-processor configurations
 Socket G34

16-core – Abu Dhabi MCM (6366 HE and above)
Released November 5, 2012.

 CPU steppings: C0
 Multi-chip module consisting of two dies, each with four Piledriver module
 L2 cache: 4 × 2 MB per die (16 MB total)
 L3 cache: 2 × 8 MB, shared within each die
 Clock rate: 1.8 GHz (6366 HE) – 2.8 GHz (6386 SE)
 4 × HyperTransport 3.1 at 3.2 GHz (6.40 GT/s per link)
 HT Assist
 Support for DDR3 1866 MHz memory
 Turbo CORE support, from 3.1 GHz (6366 HE) to 3.5 GHz (6386 SE)
 Supports up to quad-processor configurations
 Socket G34

Opteron X (28 nm bulk) – Jaguar microarchitecture

Quad-core – Kyoto (X1150)
Released May 29, 2013
 Single SoC with one Jaguar module and integrated I/O
 Configurable CPU frequency and TDP
 L2 cache: 2 MB shared
 CPU frequency: 1.0–2.0 GHz
 Max. TDP: 9–17 W
 Support for DDR3-1600 memory
 Socket FT3

Quad-core APU – Kyoto (X2150) 
Released May 29, 2013
 Single SoC with one Jaguar module, integrated GCN GPU and I/O
 Configurable CPU/GPU frequency and TDP
 L2 cache: 2 MB shared
 CPU frequency: 1.1–1.9 GHz
 GPU frequency: 266–600 MHz
 GPU cores: 128
 Max. TDP: 11–22 W
 Support for DDR3-1600 memory
 Socket FT3

Opteron A (28 nm) – ARM Cortex-A57 ARM microarchitecture

A1100-series
The Opteron A1100-series "Seattle" (28 nm) are SoCs based on ARM Cortex-A57 cores that use the ARMv8-A instruction set. They were first released in January 2016.
 Cores: 4–8
 Frequency: 1.7–2.0 GHz
 L2 cache: 2 MB (4 core) or 4 MB (8 core)
 L3 cache: 8 MB
 Thermal design power: 25 W (4 core) or 32 W (8 core)
 Up to 64 GB DDR3L-1600 and up to 128 GB DDR4-1866 with ECC
 SoC peripherals include 14 × SATA 3,  2 × integrated 10 GbE LAN, and eight PCI Express lanes in ×8, ×4, and ×2 configurations

Opteron X (28 nm bulk) – Excavator microarchitecture 

Released June, 2017

Dual-core – Toronto (X3216)
 L2 cache: 1 MB
 CPU frequency: 1.6 GHz
 Turbo CORE support, 3.0 GHz
 GPU frequency: 800 MHz
 TDP: 12–15 W
 Support for DDR4 1600 MHz memory

Quad-core – Toronto (X3418 & X3421)
 L2 cache: 2 × 1 MB
 CPU frequency: 1.8–2.1 GHz
 Turbo CORE support, 3.2–3.4 GHz
 GPU frequency: 800 MHz
 TDP: 12–35 W
 Support for DDR4 2400 MHz memory

Supercomputers

Opteron processors first appeared in the top 100 systems of the fastest supercomputers in the world list in the early 2000s.  By the summer of 2006, 21 of the top 100 systems used Opteron processors, and in the November 2010 and June 2011 lists the Opteron reached its maximum representation of 33 of the top 100 systems.   The number of Opteron-based systems decreased fairly rapidly after this peak, falling to 3 of the top 100 systems by November 2016, and in November 2017 only one Opteron-based system remained.

Several supercomputers using only Opteron processors were ranked in the top 10 systems between 2003 and 2015, notably:

 Red Storm – Sandia National Laboratories –  system in November 2006.
 Jaguar – Oak Ridge National Laboratory – various configurations held top 10 positions between 2005 and 2011, including  in November 2009 and June 2010.
 Ranger – Texas Advanced Computing Center –  system in June 2008.
 Kraken – National Institute for Computational Sciences –  system in November 2009.
 Hopper – National Energy Research Scientific Computing Center –  system in November 2010.

Other top 10 systems using a combination of Opteron processors and compute accelerators have included:

 IBM Roadrunner – Los Alamos National Laboratory –  system in 2008.  Composed of Opteron processors with IBM PowerXCell 8i co-processors.

The only system remaining on the list (as of November 2017), also using Opteron processors combined with compute accelerators:

 Titan (supercomputer) – Oak Ridge National Laboratory –  system in 2012,  as of November 2017.  Composed of Opteron processors with Nvidia Fermi (microarchitecture) GPU-based accelerators.

Issues

Opteron without Optimized Power Management
AMD released some Opteron processors without Optimized Power Management (OPM) support, which use DDR memory. The following table describes those processors without OPM.

Opteron recall (2006)
AMD recalled some E4 stepping-revision single-core Opteron processors, including ×52 (2.6 GHz) and ×54 (2.8 GHz) models which use DDR memory. The following table describes affected processors, as listed in AMD Opteron ×52 and ×54 Production Notice of 2006.

The affected processors may produce inconsistent results if three specific conditions occur simultaneously:
 The execution of floating point-intensive code sequences
 Elevated processor temperatures
 Elevated ambient temperatures

A software verification tool for identifying the AMD Opteron processors listed in the above table that may be affected under these specific conditions is available, only to AMD OEM partners. AMD will replace those processors at no charge.

Recognition
In the February 2010 issue of Custom PC (a UK-based computing magazine focused on PC hardware), the AMD Opteron 144 (released in Summer 2005) appeared in the "Hardware Hall of Fame". It was described as "The best overclocker's CPU ever made" due to its low cost and ability to run at speeds far beyond its stock speed. (According to Custom PC, it could run at "close to 3 GHz on air".)

See also
 List of AMD Opteron microprocessors
 TDP power cap

References

External links

 Official Opteron homepage
 AMD Technical Docs
 AMD K8 Opteron technical specifications
 AMD K8 Dual Core Opteron technical specifications
 Interactive AMD Opteron rating and product ID guide
 Understanding the Detailed Architecture of AMD's 64 bit Core
 Comparison between Xeon and Opteron processor performance 
 AMD: dual-core Opteron to 3 GHz

AMD x86 microprocessors
64-bit microprocessors